The Zimbabwe cricket team toured Scotland in September 2021 to play three Twenty20 International (T20I) matches. All of the matches took place at The Grange Club in Edinburgh. Scotland's last home international fixtures were in August 2019.

Scotland won the first T20I match by seven runs, with Zimbabwe winning the second match by ten runs to level the series. Zimbabwe won the third T20I by six wickets to win the series 2–1.

Squads

Zimbabwe's Brendan Taylor retired from international cricket following the final match of Zimbabwe's tour of Ireland, which took place two days prior.

T20I series

1st T20I

2nd T20I

3rd T20I

References

External links
 Series home at ESPN Cricinfo

2021 in Scottish cricket
2021 in Zimbabwean cricket
International cricket competitions in 2021
Zimbabwean cricket tours abroad
International cricket tours of Scotland